Szczecin Philharmonic, officially Mieczysław Karłowicz Philharmonic, founded in 1948, is a philharmonic of the city of Szczecin, Poland. In 2015, the new building of the philharmonic was awarded the European Union Prize for Contemporary Architecture.

History
The first concert under the direction of Felicjan Lasota took place in October 25, 1948. In 1958 the Philharmonic was named after the renowned Polish classical composer and conductor Mieczysław Karłowicz (1876-1909). Until 2014 the Philharmonic was located in the representative rooms of the Municipal Office, on Armii Krajowej Square. From September 14, 2014 the new seat of the Philharmonic is a building on 48 Małopolska Street, designed by Studio Barozzi Veiga from Barcelona.

The music venue covers an area of 13,000 square meters and contains a main concert hall with 1000 seats for concert-goers as well as a smaller hall with a capacity for 200 spectators and a number of conference rooms. The characteristic ice-like shape of the philharmonic and its translucent ribbed-glass façade, which gives the building a white glow at night, has become a new icon of the city and has received numerous architectural awards such as First Prize in the prestigious Eurobuild Awards 2014 contest in the category of Architectural Design of the Year. In 2014, a prominent Polish composer Krzysztof Penderecki specially composed a fanfare for the official opening ceremony of the new building and it was performed by the Szczecin Philharmonic Orchestra.

Directors
Dorota Serwa (2012–present)
Andrzej Oryl (2006-2012)
Jadwiga Igiel-Sak (1994-2006)
Jarosław Lipke (1990-1994)
Stefan Marczyk (1971-1990)
Józef Wiłkomirski (1955-1971)
Janusz Cegiełła (1953-1955)

Gallery

See also
List of concert halls in Poland

References

Concert halls in Poland
Culture in Szczecin
Buildings and structures in Szczecin
Polish orchestras
1948 establishments in Poland
Music venues completed in 2014
Old Town, Szczecin